Charleroi-West is a secondary railway station serving Charleroi, Belgium. It is one of two railway stations located in downtown Charleroi, the other one being the much larger Charleroi-South railway station. Charleroi-West is also a station of the Charleroi metro.

Rail station

Charleroi-West is a small, unstaffed station with no building or other services of its own, served only by Belgian railway line 140 linking Charleroi to Ottignies. Charleroi-West used to be a dead-end station (and thus the terminus of line 140) until 27 May 1987, when a rail connection to Charleroi-South was opened. The 6 km industrial line 260 links Charleroi-Ouest with the freight classification yard of Monceau-sur-Sambre.

Because of its proximity to Charleroi-South and the limited train service, Charleroi-West sees very little passenger traffic, with a weekday average of 75 boarding passengers on weekdays (20 on Saturdays, 30 on Sundays) in 2007.

The original station, inaugurated in 1855, was located slightly to the South. The current station was built between 1884 and 1886.

Train services
The station is served by the following service(s):

Local services (L-14) Ottignies - Fleurus - Charleroi - Tamines - Namur - Jambes

Metro station

West is a Charleroi Metro station, located at the western end of Charleroi downtown, in fare zone 1. The station is accessible through three distinct street entrances leading to a mezzanine, giving access to the central platform via escalators.

The station has been renovated in 2009, with a new decoration based on works of local artist Charles Szymkowicz. The mezzanine level hosts 11 reproductions of Szymkowicz's watercolor paintings depicting Tuscany landscapes, made by Belgian ceramist Maurice Joly. One of the station entrances is adorned with a 3.5 x 4m fresco depicting Szymkowicz and his mother passing the so-called "viaduct" bridge where the station is now located.

Nearby points of interest

 Charleroi Expo, main exhibition hall in Charleroi.

Transfers

TEC Charleroi bus lines 41, 43, 83, 85, 86 and Midi-Docherie.

See also
 List of railway stations in Belgium
 List of Charleroi Pre-metro stations
 Charleroi Pre-metro
 Charleroi

References

External links
 Official station page at the SNCB website
 Real time departures
 Real time arrivals

Railway stations in Belgium
Railway stations opened in 1855
Railway stations opened in 1980
Railway stations in Hainaut (province)
Public transport in Charleroi
Buildings and structures in Charleroi
1855 establishments in Belgium